Elminiech Battery, also known as Figuella Battery, San Raimondo Battery or Oitelboura Battery, was an artillery battery in Birżebbuġa, Malta. It was built by the Order of Saint John in 1715–16 as part of a series of coastal fortifications around the Maltese Islands.

Elminiech Battery was part of a chain of fortifications that defended Marsaxlokk Bay, which also included six other batteries, the large Saint Lucian Tower, two smaller De Redin towers, four redoubts and three entrenchments. The nearest fortifications to Elminiech Battery were the Birżebbuġa Entrenchments to the northwest and Fresnoy Redoubt to the east. Construction of the battery cost 1451 scudi.

The battery was demolished, and its site is now occupied by part of the Malta Freeport.

References

Batteries in Malta
Hospitaller fortifications in Malta
Military installations established in 1715
Demolished buildings and structures in Malta
Birżebbuġa
Limestone buildings in Malta
18th-century fortifications
1715 establishments in Malta
18th Century military history of Malta